The 1948–49 Allsvenskan was the 15th season of the top division of Swedish handball. 10 teams competed in the league. IFK Karlskrona won the league, but the title of Swedish Champions was awarded to the winner of Svenska mästerskapet. Skövde AIK and IFK Lidingö were relegated.

League table

Attendance

References 

Swedish handball competitions